Cricket Kenya is the official ICC recognised organisation chosen to represent Kenya in terms of cricket issues. They are in charge of overseeing the Kenyan Cricket Team. Cricket Kenya organizes two six team regional tournaments in the T20 and 50 Over formats of the game to replace the defunct Sahara Elite League. These are the East Africa Cup and Premier League.  Cricket Kenya organizes the Kenya national cricket team and conducts the international matches with the team.

Structure 
Cricket Kenya consists of a national board consisting of a chairperson, vice chairperson, treasurer, secretary and directors selected from its affiliate provincial associations. These are
 Nairobi Province Cricket Association
 Rift Valley Cricket Association
 Coast Cricket Association

History

Cricket in Kenya

Cricket in Kenya dates back to the early 1890s when colonial settlers, and administrators began playing against one another in Nairobi and Mombasa among several other venues. The first match of any consequence took place in 1899, and in 1910 a three-day fixture between Officials and Settlers started, remaining the highlight of the domestic calendar until 1964, along with Europeans v. Asians which began in 1933. In 1966, Kenya become a member of the East African Cricket Conference (E.A.C.C.) and participated in its annual Quadrangular tournament which included the three East African countries and Zambia. The tournament played in each respective country by rotation saw Kenya winning nine of the 15 competitions between 1960 and 1980. A number of Kenyans took part in the 1975 World Cup as part of the East Africa side, and that unit again appeared in the inaugural 1979 ICC Trophy, but by 1982 Kenya were playing under their own flag, under the Kenya Cricket Association. It was under this body that Kenyan cricket reached its peak, at the 2003 Cricket World Cup, which it co-hosted and reached the semifinals of. In subsequent years however, bitter disputes between board and players led to a series of strikes, but more cripplingly, the KCA found itself battling most of the country's stakeholders. By the end of the dispute in 2005, Kenyan cricket was in the doldrums, was sponsorless, and was effectively in international isolation. Later in the year it was stripped of its ODI status by the ICC.

Establishment Of Cricket Kenya
The final installation of Cricket Kenya as the body in charge of Cricket in Kenya came at the end of a long drawn out dispute the previous management, the Kenya Cricket Association and its Provincial boards among other stakeholders in the game. The dispute, which centered around issues such as floundering constitutional review, and financial irregularities which had seen the KCA rack up almost 500,000 dollars of debt, and as well as periodic player disputes over pay that eventually saw the KCA lose all credibility within Kenyan cricketing circles as players, administrators and even the Kenya government gradually withdrew all recognition and support of the KCA in favour of Cricket Kenya, which was then an interim board put together by the Kenya Government to avoid the chaos that had been created by the KCA over the management of Cricket in Kenya. Ultimately, with the intervention of a high powered ICC delegation led by Percy Sonn and Peter Chingoka, an agreement on a new elections and a new constitution was agreed upon. The board members that were elected in the subsequent elections then formally wound up the Kenya Cricket Association paving the way for its official replacement by a new organisational body to be known as Cricket Kenya.
Tom Tikolo served as the CEO of Cricket Kenya from 2005 to 2009 when he resigned due to cash scandal. After extensive searching he was replaced by Tom Sears in mid-2010. Sears himself steeped down in mid 2012 to pursue a career in rugby administration.

See also
 Kenya national cricket team
 National Elite League Twenty20

References

External links 
 Cricket Kenya Official Website
 
 
 

 
Sports governing bodies in Kenya
Sports organizations established in 2005
2005 establishments in Kenya